Joshua Titima (born 20 October 1992) is a Zambian international footballer who plays for Mufulira Wanderers, as a goalkeeper.

Career
Titima has played club football for Power Dynamos.

He made his international debut for Zambia in 2012. He was Zambia's third choice goalkeeper and the 2012 Africa Cup of Nations was his first Africa Cup of Nations, but he did not play any games. He was named in Zambia's provisional squad for the 2013 Africa Cup of Nations, and later made the final squad.

References

1992 births
Living people
Zambian footballers
Association football goalkeepers
Zambia international footballers
Africa Cup of Nations-winning players
2012 Africa Cup of Nations players
2013 Africa Cup of Nations players
2015 Africa Cup of Nations players
 Mufulira Wanderers F.C. players